The Mexican League is a baseball league based in Mexico.

Mexican League may also refer to:

Mexican Pacific League, a winter baseball league also based in Mexico
Liga MX, the top Mexican association football league